Pavlin Ivanov (born March 28, 1993) is a Bulgarian professional basketball player for Balkan Botevgrad of the NBL. He plays as a shooting guard.

Career
Ivanov started playing basketball at the local youth club in Yambol - Tiger, at the age of nine. In 2008 he moved to Benetton Basket youth club  and made his professional debut there in the season 2011–12. The next season, he signed for KK Budućnost. In December 2013 he returned to his home town to play for BC Yambol. In 2014-15 he signed for Levski, but he finished the season at BC Beroe. The next season Ivanov moved to Lukoil Academic. His club won the League and he was awarded finals MVP. In the first days of 2018 he moved to Levski Lukoil with all the first team players of Lukoil Academic, as part of a sponsorship switch between the two clubs. He signed with Balkan for 1+1 years, in November 2018.

On February 2, 2020, he has signed with Beroe in the Bulgarian NBL.  The same year in June he joined Rilski Sportist.  

After two seasons with Rilski Sportist, Ivanov moved for a second time to defending champion that year Balkan Botevgrad.

Bulgarian national team
Ivanov represented the senior men's Bulgarian national team in the EuroBasket 2022, averaging 10.2 points per game. His first men's game was against Romania. 
With Bulgaria's youth national teams, he played at the 2010 FIBA Europe Under-18 Championship and 2013 FIBA Europe Under-20 Championship.

References

External links
Yambolbasketball profile
Bgbasket profile
Eurobasket profile
Eurocup profile

1993 births
Living people
BC Balkan Botevgrad players
BC Beroe players
BC Levski Sofia players
BC Yambol players
Bulgarian men's basketball players
KK Budućnost players
Pallacanestro Treviso players
PBC Academic players
People from Yambol
Shooting guards